This glossary contains Brazilian terms related to criminal or corruption investigations, and supporting concepts from politics, the law, government, criminology, and law enforcement.

This glossary is not a general or indiscriminate list of terms from Brazilian Portuguese, and is limited in scope. Because this is a specialized glossary, the first meaning(s) listed for a term will be the one(s) related to topics within the scope of this glossary, even if that is not the most common meaning in the spoken or written language for the term in a more general context.

Words which may appear to be obvious on the surface, but which have specialized meanings in certain contexts, are included (e.g., : not just "prison", but also "arrest"; or : not just "resource", but also "appeal", "appellate"). Common expressions for governmental agencies or positions are included for convenience, even if the translations are straightforward, as they come up frequently in definitions of less obvious terms.

There is one alphabetical list, with headwords in Portuguese or English, and aliases, translations, or explanations given as appropriate. This glossary concerns meaning and usage in Brazilian Portuguese. To avoid constant repetition, where the word Portuguese appears alone, it means Brazilian Portuguese.

A

B

C

D

F

J

P

Q

R

S

T

U

V

W

See also 

 Offshoots of Operation Car Wash
 Phases of Operation Car Wash
 :pt:Categoria:Crimes"Crime" category on pt-wiki
 :pt:Categoria:Direito penalCriminal law
 :pt:Categoria:Governo do BrasilGovernment of Brazil
 :pt:Categoria:Operação Lava JatoOperation Car Wash
 :pt:Categoria:Política do BrasilPolitics of Brazil

 All links below are articles in Portuguese, from pt-wiki

 Crime acessório
 Crime à distância
 Crime ambiental
 Crime autônomo
 Crime comissivo
 Crime complexo
 Crime comum
 Crime consumado
 Crime continuado
 Crime contra a humanidade
 Crime culposo
 Crime de dano
 Crime de fato permanente
 Crime de guerra
 Crime de lesa-majestade
 Crime de mão própria
 Crime de responsabilidade
 Crime doloso
 Crime eleitoral
 Crime formal
 Crime funcional
 Crime habitual
 Crime hediondo
 Crime impossível
 Crime instantâneo
 Crime material
 Crime organizado
 Crime passional
 Crime perfeito
 Crime permanente
 Crime plurissubsistente
 Crime político
 Crime preterdoloso
 Crime preterintencional
 Crime próprio
 Crime provocado
 Crime putativo
 Crime qualificado
 Crime sexual
 Crime simples
 Crime tentado
 Crime unissubsistente
 Crime vago
 Criminoso
 Delinquência

References

Notes

Citations

External links 

 Legislação brasileira traduzida para o Inglêsofficial English translations of the Constitution, and dozens of other Brazilian laws
 Glossary of the Banco Central
 About :pt:Condução coercitiva:
 Jusbrasil
 Lex Magister
 Juris Blog
 Constitution of the Federative Republic of Brazil;  pdf; 432 pages
 Constituição da República Federativa do Brasil 
 Michaelis dictionariesa set of bilingual, online Brazilian dictionaries
 Operation Car Wash glossarysomewhat light-hearted, but has serious information about terms; by Gabriela Goulart, editor at O Globo.

Brazil investigative terms
Corruption in Brazil
Crime
Government of Brazil
Politics of Brazil
Wikipedia glossaries using description lists